This is a list of notable record labels from Quebec.

 Alien8 Recordings 
 Ambiances Magnétiques
 Audiogram
 Arbutus Records
 Bonsound Records
 Constellation Records
 Dare to Care Records
 Distribution Select
 Disques Victoire
 Duprince
 High Life Music 
 Justin Time Records
 La Tribu
 Mille Pattes Records 
 Og Music
 P572
 Relentless Records
 Secret City Records
 Stomp Records
 Zéro Musique

See also

 :Category:Quebec record labels
 List of Quebec musicians
 Music of Quebec
 Culture of Quebec

 
Record labels, List of Quebec
Record labels, List of Quebec
Quebec record labels, List of